Charles Island may refer to:

 Charles Island, Connecticut, USA
 Charles Island (Nunavut), Canada
 Floreana Island, Galápagos Islands, Ecuador - originally named "Charles Island"

See also
 Prince Charles Island, Nunavut, Canada
 Sir Charles Hardy Islands, Queensland, Australia